The Eastern Association for the Surgery of Trauma is a 501(c)(3) medical association of American trauma surgeons. It has over 2,000 members who meet at an annual four-day conference. Its official journal is the Journal of Trauma and Acute Care Surgery.

References

External links

Surgical organizations based in the United States
Organizations established in 1987
Medical and health professional associations in Chicago
1987 establishments in Illinois